Aluma is a communal settlement in Israel.

Aluma may also refer to:

 Aluma (street paper), a Swedish street newspaper
 Keve Aluma (born 1998), American college basketball player
 Peter Aluma (born 1973), Nigerian basketball player
 Lake Aluma, Oklahoma, US, a town